Golubinje is a village in the municipality of Majdanpek, Serbia. According to the 2002 census, the village has a population of 1,079 people.

References

Populated places in Bor District